= Jelloul Ben Cherifa =

Tunisian pharmacist and nationalist activist

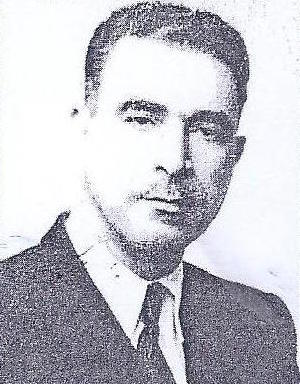
- Jelloul Ben Cherifa at the 1956 Tunisian Constituent Assembly
- Occupation: Pharmacist
- Known for: Nationalist activism; early Tunisian pharmacy in Sousse

Jelloul Ben Cherifa was a Tunisian pharmacist and nationalist activist. He is described as the first Tunisian pharmacist established in Sousse, where he opened his practice in 1930, and was later active in the Tunisian national movement during the struggle for independence.

== Biography ==
A graduate of the Faculty of Toulouse, Ben Cherifa settled in Sousse in 1930. He is described in the history of pharmacy in Tunisia as the first Tunisian pharmacist established in the city and as a prominent nationalist.

== Nationalist activism ==
Ben Cherifa was a leading figure in the Destourian movement in the Sahel region. During the military trial relating to the January 1952 events in Sousse, Le Monde described him as president of the Neo Destour federation of the Sahel, vice-president of the mixed chamber of agriculture and commerce of the centre, and former president of the Office de l'huile.

A Tunisian institutional source commemorating the events of 22 January 1952 states that a major demonstration in Sousse set out from Ben Cherifa's pharmacy and identifies him as president of the local Destourian organization.

In Rebellious Tunisia, Ali Belhaouane gives Ben Cherifa a central role in the Sousse events, presenting him as head of the local Destourian structure, responsible for keeping the demonstrators calm and disciplined and for leading the march. Belhaouane adds that Ben Cherifa advanced to demand the release of detainees and was wounded in the thigh when French forces opened fire.

Regarded by the prosecution as one of the principal instigators of the Sousse demonstrations, he was acquitted by the military tribunal in December 1953.

== Constituent Assembly ==
After Tunisian independence, Ben Cherifa was among the elected members for the Sousse constituency in the Constituent Assembly of Tunisia, 1956.

== Legacy ==
An avenue in Sousse bears his name, as documented in a publication of the Regional Council of the Order of Physicians of Central Tunisia.
